WJFN (820 kHz) is a conservative talk radio formatted radio station licensed to Chester, Virginia, serving the Richmond/Petersburg area. WJFN is owned by John Fredericks and operated by MAGA Radio Network. WJFN also transmits on FM translator station W224EB on 92.7 MHz, based in Chester, Virginia.

WJFN is a simulcast of WJFN-FM 100.5 and mostly carries nationally syndicated talk shows, including Michael Savage, Steve Bannon, Dennis Prager, Larry Elder, and Red Eye Radio.

History

In June 1988, WGGM, formerly a daytimer at AM 1410 on the dial, moved to the 820 frequency, allowing 24-hour broadcasting. Tracy Lynn, longtime local television traffic reporter at WWBT, was the first nighttime DJ on WGGM.

In May 2014, VARTV reported the station's plans to change call letters to WNTW and switch to syndicated conservative talk as "The Answer" at 8 a.m. on Monday, June 2. The call sign was officially changed to WNTW on June 1.

Effective June 16, 2020, John Fredericks' Disruptor Radio acquired WNTW and W224EB for $240,000. The call letters were changed to WJFN on June 17, 2020, matching WJFN-FM 100.5, which this station began to simulcast.

Translator
In addition to the main station, WJFN is relayed by an FM translator.

References

External links

JFN (AM)
Radio stations established in 1965
1965 establishments in Virginia
Talk radio stations in the United States
Conservative talk radio